The 2018 Arizona State Sun Devils football team represented Arizona State University in the 2018 NCAA Division I FBS football season. They were led by first year head coach Herm Edwards and played their home games at Sun Devil Stadium. They were a member of the South Division of the Pac-12 Conference. The Sun Devils finished the season 7–6, 5–4 in Pac-12 play to finish in second place in the South Division. They were invited to the Las Vegas Bowl where they lost to Fresno State.

Personnel

Coaching staff

Roster

Previous season
The Sun Devils finished second in the Pac 12 South Division with a record of 7–6 overall and 6–3 in conference played. They were invited to the Sun Bowl, where they lost to NC State, 52–31. The Sun Devils also replaced head coach Todd Graham with new head coach Herm Edwards

Offseason departures
ASU had 18 Graduates, 2 transfers, 1 left the team, 1 retired medically.

2018 NFL draft

ASU players drafted into the NFL

Undrafted NFL free agents

Preseason
On December 20, 2017, NCAA Football had its first ever early signing period, during which Arizona State signed nine recruits. On national signing day the Sun Devils received eight more high school recruits tipping off the signing period with a total of 17 high school recruits, four JUCO transfers and one transfer which totals 22 total recruits in the 2018 offseason.

Position key

Recruiting class

|}

Incoming Transfers
Arizona State had four junior college transfers and one college transfer.

Pac-12 Media Days
The 2018 Pac-12 media days started on July 25, 2018 in Hollywood, California. Herm Edwards (HC), N'Keal Harry (WR) & Manny Wilkins (QB) at Pac-12 Media Days. The Pac-12 media poll was released with the Sun Devils predicted to finish in last place at Pac-12 South division.

Award watch lists
Listed in the order that they were released

Schedule

Rankings

Game summaries

UTSA

Statistics

Michigan State

Statistics

at San Diego State

Statistics

at Washington

Statistics

Oregon State

Statistics

at Colorado

Statistics

Stanford

Statistics

at USC

Statistics

Utah

Statistics

UCLA

Statistics

at Oregon

Statistics

at Arizona

Statistics

vs. Fresno State (Las Vegas Bowl)

Statistics

Awards
Pac-12 Freshman Defensive Player of the Year: Merlin Robertson

Players drafted into the NFL

References

Arizona State
Arizona State Sun Devils football seasons
Arizona State Sun Devils football